João Freixo mostly known for his stage name LON3R JOHNY is a Portuguese rapper and trap artist.

Career 
He gained national recognition after he joined in 2018, ProfJam's record label Think Music.

His style is innovative on the Portuguese hip hop scene as he mixes the Portuguese language with the English language repeatedly in his songs' lyrics.

He has performed at the 2019 Meo Sudoeste at the LG Stage.

In 21 October 2020 he left Think Music to join Eight-O-Eight.

In July 2021 he performed at the first ever Rolling Loud festival in Europe, which had its first location in Portugal at Praia da Rocha, Portimão.

In 24 September 2022 he performed for the first time in Arraial do Técnico in Portugal, which had thousands of students attending this event. In this event he interacted with a lot of his young fans (for example, the migalhão).

Discography

EP's

Singles

As lead artist

As featured artist

See also 
 Think Music Records

External links 
 YouTube
 Spotify
 SoundCloud
 Instagram
 Twitter
 Facebook

References 

Living people
Portuguese rappers
21st-century Portuguese male singers
Year of birth missing (living people)